Patricia Monk (1938-2021) was a professor at Dalhousie University from 1970 to her retirement in 2003. She was the first woman to be promoted to full professor in Dalhousie's English department and is known for her work on Canadian literature and science fiction. She was born in Stockport, and died at the age of 83 on 29 December 2021 in Halifax.

Selected publications 
Alien Theory: The Alien as Archetype in the Science Fiction Short Story (2006)

Mud and Magic Shows: Robertson Davies's Fifth Business (1992)

The Gilded Beaver: An Introduction to the Life and Work of James De Mille (Toronto: ECW Press, 1991)

The Smaller Infinity: Jungian Self in the Novels of Robertson Davies (1982)

References

External links 
The Patricia Monk fonds at Dalhousie University Archives

1938 births
2021 deaths
Canadian women academics
Canadian studies
Science fiction academics
Academic staff of the Dalhousie University